Vandiver may refer to:

People
 Elizabeth Vandiver (born 1956), American classical scholar
 Ernest Vandiver (1918–2005), Georgia governor
 Frank Vandiver (1925–2005), American historian
 Harry Vandiver (1882–1973), American mathematician
 J. Kim Vandiver (born 1945), American MIT professor and engineer
 Murray Vandiver (1845–1916), American politician
 Robert R. Vandiver (1805–1885), American politician and contractor
 Shaun Vandiver (born 1968), American professional basketball player
 Willard Duncan Vandiver (1854–1932), congressman from Missouri

Places
 Vandiver, Missouri
 Vandiver, Alabama

See also
Vandivier